Maurizio Montalbini (4 September 1953 – 19 September 2009) was an Italian sociologist and caver who had lived in complete isolation in an underground chamber multiple times since 1986.

Biography
Montalbini was born at Senigallia. 

On December 14, 1986, he entered the Frasassi Caves of the Apennine Mountains, near Ancona. A video feed was set up to monitor him from the surface. He emerged on July 12, 1987, breaking the world record for complete isolation. An Ancona local named Stefania Follini heard of his exploits and decided to attempt it herself; NASA sponsored her stay in a cave in New Mexico. Her menstrual cycle stopped, and she began a sleep cycle of waking for 23 hours at a time and sleeping for 10 hours. Both Follini and Montalbini found that time passed quickly underground.

Throughout 1993, Montalbini stayed in a cave in Pesaro. He again lost his sense of time, thinking it was only June when he was called to the surface in December. More precisely, he entered on December 6, 1992 and got out on December 5, 1993, thinking it was June 6, 1993.

In October 2006, Montalbini entered a cave called "Underlab" with the intention of spending three years there. He planned for it to be his final experiment, but hoped it would provide valuable insight into the natural cycles of the body. This stay ended up lasting just over 260 days.

Montalbini would eat pills for meals while in the cave, but also brought along honey, nuts and chocolate on his most recent trip.

In September 2009, Montalbini died from a heart attack at Pieve Torina, near Macerata. Officially, his death was in no way connected to his experimental cave dwellings.

See also 
 Michel Siffre
 Chronobiology
 Circadian rhythm
 Stefania Follini

References

External links
 Maurizio Montalbini - Daily Telegraph obituary

1953 births
2009 deaths
People from Senigallia
Italian sociologists
Cavers